Franciscan monastery or Franciscan friary may refer to a great number of locations, including:

 Franciscan Friary, Baja, in Baja, Hungary
 Franciscan Monastery in Kadaň, in Kadaň, Czech Republic 
 Mount St. Sepulchre Franciscan Monastery, in Washington, DC, United States
 Buttevant Franciscan Friary, Buttevant, Ireland

For a more complete list, see :Category:Franciscan monasteries